Wolfgang Pietzsch (21 December 1930, Wittgendorf – 29 December 1996, Leipzig) was a chess Grandmaster (1965). He played in the Chess Olympiads of 1952, 1958, 1960, 1962, 1966 and 1968.

References

External links

1930 births
1996 deaths
Chess grandmasters
Chess Olympiad competitors
German chess players
20th-century chess players